Core plugs, also called freeze plugs or Welch plugs, are used to fill the sand casting core holes found on water-cooled internal combustion engines.

Purpose 
Sand cores are used to form the internal cavities when the engine block or cylinder head(s) is cast. These cavities are usually the coolant passages. Holes are designed into the casting to support internal sand forms and to facilitate the removal of the sand after the casting has cooled. These holes have no purpose after the sand has been removed. A core plug is a cap at the end of these passages used to prevent water or coolant leaking from the engine.

Design 
Core plugs are usually thin metal cups press fitted into the casting holes, but may be made of rubber or other materials. In some high-performance engines the core plugs are large diameter cast metal threaded pipe plugs.

Core plugs can often be a source of leaks due to corrosion caused by cooling system water. Although modern antifreeze chemicals do not evaporate and may be considered "permanent", anti-corrosion additives gradually deplete and must be replenished.

The slang term "freeze plug" was derived many years ago in situations where the water in an engine block could freeze (due to plain water being used in winter rather than anti-freeze coolant). The expansion of the water as it froze would cause the core plug to pop out of the engine, leading to the term "freeze plug".

Welch plug
The Welch plug is a type of core plug that is made from a thin disc of metal. The Welch plug is dome-shaped and inserted into the casting hole with the convex side facing outwards. When installed by striking the Welch plug with a hammer, the dome collapses slightly, expanding it laterally to seal the hole. This differs from other dish-shaped core plug designs, which form a seal when their tapered sides are pressed into the casting hole.

The Welch plug was originally designed in the 1900s at the Welch Motor Car Company in the United States. Prior to the invention of the Welch plug, the core holes were sealed using pipe plugs. During the testing of a car, one of the pipe plugs backed out. In order to get back on the road, one of the Welch brothers installed a press-fit quarter or half dollar coin into the hole using a hammer. The design of the Welch plug was refined based on this principle of a press-fit metallic disc.

References 

Engine components